The year 1881 in archaeology involved some significant events.

Explorations
 Alfred Maudslay begins his thorough examination of Quiriguá.

Excavations
 Timgad, Algeria, is excavated.
 The excavations at Olympia, Greece which began in 1875 and were led by Ernst Curtius end.
 Mount Nemrut, Turkey, is excavated by German engineer Karl Sester.
 Great Pyramid of Cholula in Mexico is investigated by Swiss-born American archaeologist Adolph Bandelier.
 Pyramid of Unas in Egypt is investigated by French archaeologist Gaston Maspero.

Finds
 March - Augustus Pitt Rivers finds palaeolithic flints in concreted gravels of the Nile terraces near Thebes.
 "Official" discovery of collective tomb DB320 at Deir el-Bahari in Egypt.
 Capt. H. L. Wells, RE, finds Qadamgah in Fars Province, Persia (Iran).
 The birch bark Bakhshali manuscript, incorporating perhaps the earliest known use of mathematical zero, is unearthed near Bakhshali in British India.

Publications
 John Evans - The Ancient Bronze Implements, Weapons and Ornaments of Great Britain and Ireland.
 H. A. Fletcher - "The archaeology of the west Cumberland iron trade". Transactions of the Cumberland & Westmorland Archaeological Society 5:5–21.
 Possible earliest use of the term "Industrial archaeology" in the English language.

Other events
 February 22 - 'Cleopatra's Needle' erected in Central Park, New York.

Births
 December 19 - Hetty Goldman, American archaeologist (d. 1972)

Deaths
 January 24 - Frances Stackhouse Acton, English botanist, archaeologist, artist and writer (b. 1794)
 May 19 - Joseph Barnard Davis, English craniologist (b. 1801)
 June 21 - Ferdinand Keller, Swiss archaeologist (b. 1800)

References

Archaeology
Archaeology by year
Archaeology
Archaeology